Jimmy Tubbs Jr. (February 16, 1950 – May 9, 2009) was a college basketball coach. A native of Oakwood, Texas, he was head coach of the SMU Mustangs team from 2004 to 2006 before being fired related to NCAA violations.

Before becoming a head coach of the SMU Mustangs, Tubbs was an assistant coach for 2 seasons under Kelvin Sampson at Oklahoma and an assistant at SMU for 12 years prior.  Tubbs died on May 9, 2009.

References

1950 births
2009 deaths
American men's basketball coaches
Basketball coaches from Texas
Bishop College alumni
College men's basketball head coaches in the United States
High school basketball coaches in the United States
Oklahoma Sooners men's basketball coaches
People from Oakwood, Texas
Prairie View A&M University alumni
SMU Mustangs men's basketball coaches